A Tiltrotor is a type of vertical takeoff and landing (VTOL) aircraft that convert from vertical to horizontal flight by rotating propellers or ducted fans from horizontal positions like conventional aircraft propellers to vertical like a helicopter's rotors.

Aircraft

|-
| Aerocopter Sarus || US || Mono rotor || Commuter ||  || Project || 0 ||  
|-
| American Dynamics AD-150 || US || Twin fans || Scout UAV ||  || Project || 0 || USMC Tier III VUAS submission. Ducted fans. 
|-
| AgustaWestland AW609 || Italy || Twin rotor || Civil transport ||  || Prototype ||  || Originally Bell-Augusta BA609. 
|-
| AgustaWestland Project Zero || Italy || Twin fans || Experimental ||  || Prototype || 1 || Flight test|Hybrid propulsion. Ducted fans. 
|-
| Baldwin MTR-SD || US || Mono rotor || Experimental ||  || Prototype || 1 || Small radio-control mono tiltrotor testbed. 
|-
| Bell XV-3 || US || Twin rotor || Experimental ||  || Prototype || 2 || Originally designated XH-33. 
|-
| Bell XV-15 || US || Twin rotor || Experimental ||  || Prototype || 2 || Developed into V-22 Osprey. 
|-
| Bell Boeing V-22 Osprey || US || Twin rotor || Military transport ||  || Production ||  ||  
|-
| Bell V-247 Vigilant || US ||  || Multirole UAV ||  || Project || 0 ||  
|-
| Bell V-280 Valor || US ||  || Heavy transport ||  || Prototype ||  || Intended for both commuter and military roles. 
|-
| Bell Eagle Eye || US || Twin rotor || Scout UAV ||  || Prototype ||  ||  
|-
| Bell Boeing Quad TiltRotor || US || Quad rotor || Heavy transport ||  || Project || 0 || Several redesigns. 
|-
| Colugo Systems ARCopter || Israel || Quad frame || Scout UAV ||  || - ||  || Tilting quadcopter frame. 
|-
| CTA Heliconair HC-I Convertiplano || Brazil ||  || Experimental ||  || Prototype || 1 || 
|-
| Curtiss-Wright X-100 || US || Twin rotor || Experimental ||  || Prototype || 1 || Testbed for radial force principle. Developed into X-19. 
|-
| Curtiss-Wright X-19 || US || Quad rotor || Transport testbed ||  || - || 2 ||  
|-
| Doak VZ-4 || US || Twin rotor || Experimental ||  || Prototype || 1 || U.S. Army VTOL research project. Ducted fans.
|-
| Dornier Do 29 || Germany || Twin rotor || Experimental ||  || Prototype || 2 || Utility VTOL testbed. Inverted rotors. 
|-
| Dufaux triplane || Switzerland ||  || Experimental ||  || - ||  || Central rotor and engine. Built but could not fly. 
|-
| FLUTR model 1 || Germany ||  || Flying car || 2018 || Project || 0 ||  
|-
| Focke-Achgelis Fa 269 || Germany || Twin rotor || Fighter ||  || - ||  || Inverted rotors. 
|-
| IAI Panther || Israel || Trirotor || Recon UAV ||  || Prototype ||  || Third rotor for lift only. 
|-
| IAI/Hankuk FE-Panther || Israel, South Korea || Trirotor || Recon UAV ||  || Prototype ||  || Improved Panther with separate engine for horizontal flight. 
|-
| Mil Mi-30 || USSR ||  || Transport ||  || Project || 0 || "Vintoplan". 
|-
| Nord Aviation N 500 Cadet || France ||  || Experimental ||  || Prototype ||  || Ducted fans. 
|-
| Russian Helicopters Albatross || Russia ||  || UAV ||  || Project || 0 || In development; hybrid tiltrotor-tiltwing. 
|-
| Transcendental Model 1-G || US || Twin rotor || Experimental ||  || Prototype ||  || Single engine. 
|-
| Transcendental Model 2 || US ||  || Experimental ||  || - ||  || Improved Model 1.
|}

See also
 List of VTOL aircraft

References

Citations

Bibliography

Maisel, Martin D., Demo J. Giulianetti and Daniel C. Dugan.  "The History of the XV-15 Tilt Rotor Research Aircraft: From Concept to Flight". Washington, D.C.: NASA History Division, 2000.
Norton, Bill. Bell Boeing V-22 Osprey, Tiltrotor Tactical Transport. Earl Shilton, Leicester, UK: Midland Publishing, 2004. 

Tiltrotor